Malaysian Social Justice Party or  (PEKEMAS) was a political party formed by Tan Chee Khoon and Syed Hussein Alatas in 1972. On 19 July 1974, Parti Marhaen Malaysia merged with the party. The party was dissolved in 1982.

History
The party were formed by Tan Chee Khoon, Syed Hussein Alatas and Veerappen Veerathan in 1972 after Parti Gerakan Rakyat Malaysia co-founder Lim Chong Eu led Gerakan into the newly expanded Alliance (renamed as the Barisan Nasional or National Front). Tan strongly opposed this move because he felt it endorsed the race-based parties in Barisan Nasional. PEKEMAS is noted as a non-communal party and were formed based on principles similar to Gerakan. Them were joined by 2 others Gerakan MPs, V. David and Veerappen. Despite this, Tan supported the controversial government-supported New Economic Policy, which expanded the privileges given to Bumiputra (Malays and other indigenous people) under Article 153 of the Constitution because he felt tougher affirmative action was required to address Malay poverty. On 19 July 1974, Parti Marhaen Malaysia merged with the party.

In the 1974 general election, PEKEMAS suffered a terrible defeat, with Tan being the only successful candidate out of 36 candidates for Parliament. PEKEMAS' campaign against the government was predicated on denying them the requisite 2/3 majority for amending the Constitution, which Tan opposed. The Democratic Action Party and the Sarawak National Party became the largest opposition parties in Parliament, with nine seats each. This effectively hamstrung Tan's and PEKEMAS' agenda in Parliament. Tan announced his retirement from politics in 1977, although he held his Parliament and Selangor State Assembly seats until their terms expired the next year. The party influence started to wear out in 1978 due to the defection of its chairman, Ahmad Boestamam to Parti Rakyat Malaysia after 1978 general elections. The party further shrank in 1979 due to most of PEKEMAS' supporters defecting to the DAP. It managed to field a candidate in the 1982 general elections before its dissolution.

List of PEKEMAS leaders

Elected Representatives
Members of the Dewan Rakyat, 4th Malaysian Parliament
List of Malaysian State Assembly Representatives (1974–78)

Legacy
The party has been noted as having rough similarities with current Parti Keadilan Rakyat.

General elections result

State election results

See also
:Category:Malaysian Social Justice Party politicians
Politics of Malaysia
List of political parties in Malaysia
People's Justice Party

References

Socialist parties in Malaysia
1972 establishments in Malaysia
1982 disestablishments in Malaysia
Political parties established in 1972
Political parties disestablished in 1982
Defunct political parties in Malaysia